Singapore has competed in the Commonwealth Games since 1958, and has participated in fifteen of the twenty editions. Singapore first participated as a crown colony in 1958 and 1962, and as a sovereign country within the Commonwealth from 1966 onwards. The country abbreviation is SGP.

The Singapore National Olympic Council (SNOC) is the body in Singapore responsible for selecting athletes to represent Singapore at the Commonwealth Games. The SNOC is a member of the Commonwealth Games Federation.

Overall medal tally
With eighty-eight medals, Singapore is currently thirteenth in the all-time tally of medals.

Sports
Singapore's first four medals (all of them gold) came from weightlifting. Altogether, Singapore has won eight medals in weightlifting, but none since 1986. No other gold medals were won until 2002, when table tennis first appeared on the Games programme. Singapore was an immediate beneficiary, winning three golds in 2002, four in 2006, six in 2010, and six again in 2014 Commonwealth Games, topping the medal standings in the sport each time. The country also won a gold medal in badminton in 2002, and eight gold medals in shooting in various years. Singapore's first swimming medal came at the Glasgow games in 2014. Singapore won gold in table tennis, badminton, and swimming at the 2022 Commonwealth Games

Singaporeans have won medals in seven sports at the Commonwealth Games: badminton, boxing, gymnastics, shooting, swimming, table tennis and weightlifting.

Commonwealth Youth Games

Medals by Games

See also
Singapore at the Olympics
Singapore at the Asian Games

References
Singapore at the Commonwealth Games
Complete list of Singapore’s medalists at Commonwealth Games

 
Nations at the Commonwealth Games